Weltsch is a surname. Notable people with the surname include:

 Felix Weltsch (1884–1964), German-speaking Czech Jewish librarian, philosopher, and author
 Robert Weltsch (1891–1982), Czech-Israeli journalist, editor, and prominent Zionist

See also
 Welsch